The  Geophysical Institute, University of Bergen  is a marine research facility located in Bergen, Norway. Founded in 1917 by Bjørn Helland-Hansen, the institute studies the field of oceanography dealing with the patterns of the weather in the North Atlantic Ocean off the coast of Norway. Within recent years, focus has been increasingly on geophysics and environmental research. The research activities at the institute span from small scale measurement of turbulence up to studies of the large scale ocean currents, from local air and noise pollution up to studies of global scale climate change.

Areas of research focus on the Norwegian Current, the West Spitsbergen Current and the Norwegian Sea. Shifts and fluctuations in these currents are monitored, as they are thought to be indicators for climate change. Research has included  sequestration and related matters dealing with Carbon capture and storage. Since 2020 Tor Eldevik is the director of the institute. Previous directors were amongst others Dr. Peter M. Haugan, Nils Gunnar Kvamstø and Øystein Hov.

The Bergen School of Meteorology, which led to modern weather forecasting, was developed at the Geophysical Institute by Vilhelm Bjerknes and collaborators (including Carl-Gustaf Rossby) beginning in 1917.

External links
Official website

University of Bergen
Environment of Norway
Oceanographic organizations
1917 establishments in Norway